Hugo Weinstengl (born 1907, date of death unknown) was an Austrian bobsledder who competed in the early 1930s. At the 1932 Winter Olympics in Lake Placid, New York, he finished 12th and last in the two-man event.

References
1932 bobsleigh two-man results
Hugo Weinstengl's profile at Sports Reference.com

Austrian male bobsledders
Olympic bobsledders of Austria
Bobsledders at the 1928 Winter Olympics
Bobsledders at the 1932 Winter Olympics
1907 births
Year of death missing